Peter Ryan may refer to:

Sports
 Peter Ryan (cricketer) (born 1951), Australian cricketer
 Peter Ryan (footballer, born 1891) (1891–1982), Australian rules footballer for St Kilda
 Peter Ryan (footballer, born 1936) (1936–2021), Australian rules footballer for South Melbourne and police superintendent
 Peter Ryan (footballer, born 1948) (born 1948), Australian rules footballer for Hawthorn
 Peter Ryan (rugby league, Newtown), Australian rugby league footballer active 1953–1962
 Peter Ryan (rugby union) (born 1940), rugby union player who represented Australia
 Peter Ryan (rugby, born 1971) (born 1971), Australian rugby league footballer
 Peter Ryan (racing driver) (1940–1962), Formula One race driver from Canada
 Peter Ryan (basketball), player in the Canada national men's basketball team in the 1970s

Other
 Peter J. Ryan (1841–1908), Union Army soldier and Medal of Honor recipient
 Peter John Ryan (1925–2002), Australian surgeon
 Peter Ryan (columnist) (1923–2015), Australian newspaper columnist and author
 Peter Ryan (journalist), Australian journalist
 Peter Ryan (police officer) (born 1944), Commissioner of the New South Wales Police from 1996 until 2002
 Peter Ryan (politician) (born 1950), former leader of the National Party of Australia in Victoria
 Peter Ryan (singer), contestant on the first season of Australian Idol
Peter Ryan (computer scientist), British computer scientist who devised Prêt à Voter